Baroness Clark may refer to:

 Lynda Clark, Baroness Clark of Calton (born 1949), Scottish judge
 Katy Clark, Baroness Clark of Kilwinning (born 1967), British politician